Peter Reiter (born 30 June 1960) is an Austrian judoka. He competed in the men's half-middleweight event at the 1988 Summer Olympics.

References

External links
 
Peter Reiter on IJF
Homepage SK-Voest

1960 births
Living people
Austrian male judoka
Olympic judoka of Austria
Judoka at the 1988 Summer Olympics
Sportspeople from Linz
20th-century Austrian people